The canton of Calvi is an administrative division of the Haute-Corse department, southeastern France. Its borders were modified at the French canton reorganisation which came into effect in March 2015. Its seat is in Calvi.

It consists of the following communes:
 
Algajola
Aregno
Avapessa
Calenzana
Calvi
Cateri
Galéria
Lavatoggio
Lumio
Manso
Moncale
Montegrosso
Sant'Antonino
Zilia

References

Cantons of Haute-Corse